Norman Jay Ornstein (born October 14, 1948) is an American political scientist and an Emeritus scholar at the American Enterprise Institute (AEI), a Washington, D.C. conservative think tank. He is the co-author (along with Thomas E. Mann) of It's Even Worse Than It Looks: How the American Constitutional System Collided With the New Politics of Extremism.

Biography 
Norman Jay Ornstein was born in Grand Rapids, Minnesota on October 14, 1948. His father was a traveling salesman, and the family spent much of Norman's childhood in Canada. He was a child prodigy, graduated from high school when he was fourteen and from college when he was eighteen. He received his BA from the University of Minnesota, and subsequently, received a Ph.D. in political science from the University of Michigan in 1974. By the mid-1970s, he had become a professor of political science at Catholic University in Washington, D.C. and was establishing a reputation as an expert on the United States Congress.

Ornstein studies American politics and is a frequent contributor to The Washington Post and many magazines, such as The Atlantic and the National Journal. He wrote a weekly column for Roll Call from 1993 until April 10, 2013, and was co-director, along with Thomas E. Mann, of the AEI-Brookings Election Reform Project. He helped draft key parts of the Bipartisan Campaign Reform Act of 2002, also known as the McCain-Feingold Act. Ornstein is a registered Democrat, but considers himself a centrist, and has voted for individuals from both parties.

Ornstein is a member of the advisory board of the Future of American Democracy Foundation, a nonprofit, nonpartisan foundation in partnership with Yale University Press and the Yale Center for International and Area Studies "dedicated to research and education aimed at renewing and sustaining the historic vision of American democracy". He also served on the advisory board of the Institute for Law and Politics at the University of Minnesota Law School. Ornstein is also a member of the board of directors of the nonpartisan election reform group Why Tuesday?. He is on the advisory council of the cross-partisan grassroots campaign Represent.Us, where he served as a  consultant in the crafting of the American Anti-Corruption Act.

Foreign Policy named Ornstein, along with Thomas E. Mann, one of its 2012 Top 100 Global Thinkers "for diagnosing America's political dysfunction".

As of 2013, Ornstein has become known for "blistering critiques of Congress", which he has been following for the past three decades.

Ornstein supports legal recognition of same-sex marriages.

He opposed President Donald Trump. He also criticized the Electoral College, saying that the more presidents are elected without the popular vote, "the more you get the sense that voters don’t have a say in the choice of their leaders".

Personal
Ornstein is married to Judith L. Harris, a litigation attorney specializing in regulatory matters. He is a long-time friend of former U.S. Senator and comedian Al Franken. A fictional version of Ornstein appears in Franken's political spoof novel, Why Not Me?, as the campaign manager for Franken's improbable presidential run.

Ornstein and his wife, as well as their younger son Danny, established the Matthew Harris Ornstein Memorial Foundation in honor of the couple's eldest son, who died in 2015 at age 34 from accidental carbon monoxide poisoning.

Works

References

External links 

 AEI Scholar Website
 AEI-Brookings Election Reform Project
 
 Continuity of Government Project

1948 births
Living people
People from Grand Rapids, Minnesota
University of Michigan College of Literature, Science, and the Arts alumni
American political scientists
American people of Jewish descent
University of Minnesota alumni
Washington, D.C., Democrats